Avakasikal (The Inheritors) is a Malayalam-language novel by Vilasini (M. K. Menon) published in 1980. It runs into 3958 pages, in four volumes, and is the second longest novel written in any Indian language after Jeymohan's Tamil epic Venmurasu.

Background
Avakasikal is Vilasini's fifth novel and was in the making for about 10 years. It was published by Sahithya Pravarthaka Co-operative Society, world's first writers' co-operative, in 1980 and was soon taken up by critics and readers as an exceptional work of art. It was soon named one of the finest works in Malayalam literature and is now considered as Vilasini's magnum opus. It won numerous awards including Sahitya Akademi Award and Vayalar Award. After remaining out-of-print for many years, Calicut-based Poorna Publications published the book in 2012.

Plot summary
Set in Malaysia, the novel deals with Velunni Kurup, a septuagenarian self-made millionaire and a host to his greedy relatives who try to defraud him of his wealth. Krishnanunni, a leading lawyer and a close friend of Velunni Kurup is the protagonist of the novel. The novel depicts the minds of about ten persons belonging to four generations with great insight.

Awards
 1981: Sahitya Akademi Award
 1981: Odakkuzhal Award
 1983: Vayalar Award

References

1980 novels
Malayalam novels
Novels set in Malaysia
Sahitya Akademi Award-winning works
1980 Indian novels